The Roman Catholic Diocese of Achonry is a Roman Catholic diocese in the western part of Ireland. It is one of the five suffragan sees of the Archdiocese of Tuam. The diocese was often called the "bishopric of Luighne" in the Irish annals. It was not established at the Synod of Rathbreasail, but Máel Ruanaid Ua Ruadáin signed as "bishop of Luighne" at the Synod of Kells.

At present there are twenty-three parishes in the diocese, located in Counties Mayo, Roscommon and Sligo. There are twenty-six priests involved in full-time parish ministry and four involved in secondary education.

On 27 January 2020 Pope Francis appointed Paul Dempsey — parish priest of Newbridge — as the new Bishop of Achonry.  He received episcopal ordination in the diocesan cathedral, which is dedicated to The Annunciation and St. Nathy, in Ballaghaderreen, on 30 August 2020.

Geography
The diocese covers parts of counties Mayo, Roscommon and Sligo. The largest towns are Charlestown, Kiltimagh and Swinford.

Ordinaries 

List of bishops since the Reformation:
 Thomas O'Fihely (1547–1555)
 Cormac O'Coyn (1556–1561)
 Eugene O'Hart (1562–1603)
 See vacant (1603–1629)
 Andrew Lynch (Vicar Apostolic, appointed 1629)
 James Fallon (Vicar Apostolic 1631–1662)
 Maurice Durcan (Vicar Apostolic, appointed 1677)
 Hugh MacDermot (Vicar Apostolic 1684–1707, Bishop 1707–1725)
 Dominic O’Daly (1725–1735)
 John O'Hart (1735–1739)
 Walter Blake (1739–1758)
 Patrick Robert Kirwan (1758–1776)
 Philip Phillips (1776–1785)
 Boetius Egan (1785–1787)
 Thomas O'Connor (1788–1803)
 Charles Lynagh (1803–1808)
 John O'Flynn (1809–1817)
 Patrick MacNicholas (1818–1852)
 Patrick Durcan (1852–1875)
 Francis McCormack (1875–1887; coadjutor bishop 1871–1875)
 John Lyster (1888–1911)
 Patrick Morrisroe (1911–1946)
 James Fergus (1947–1976)
 Thomas Flynn (1976–2007)
 Brendan Kelly (2007–2017)
 Paul Dempsey (2020–present)

See also
 Achonry (village)
 Catholic Church in Ireland
 Diocese of Tuam, Killala and Achonry (Church of Ireland diocese)

References

External links
 Official Diocesan website
 Diocese of Achonry. Irish Catholic Bishops' Conference website.
 Diocese of Achonry. Catholic-Hierarchy website.
 Diocese of Achonry. GCatholic.org website.

Attribution

 
Religion in County Roscommon
Roman Catholic Ecclesiastical Province of Tuam